Dixie Heights High School is a 6-A high school located at 3010 Dixie Highway in Edgewood, Kentucky, United States, but has a mailing address of Fort Mitchell.

History
The school was built by the Works Progress Administration.  It opened for classes in 1936 and was dedicated by Eleanor Roosevelt. It was originally to be named for Franklin D. Roosevelt.

The school is on U.S. Route 25/U.S. Route 42 (Dixie Highway). The main building is nearly identical in construction and materials to Simon Kenton High School, located in Independence, Kentucky.  Before the renovations to both Dixie Heights High School and Simon Kenton High School, they were known as sister schools.

Dixie Heights High School is in the Kenton County School District.  The superintendent is Dr. Henry Webb.

Notable alumni

 Skeeter Davis, singer
 Trey Grayson, Kentucky Secretary of State (2004-2011)
 David S. Mann, former mayor of Cincinnati, Ohio
 Mark Pike, NFL player with the Buffalo Bills
 Brian Pillman Jr., professional wrestler
 Graham Taylor, former MLB player who briefly played with the Florida Marlins
 Ron Ziegler, press secretary to Richard Nixon

References

External links
Dixie Heights High School

Works Progress Administration in Kentucky
Educational institutions established in 1936
U.S. Route 42
Schools in Kenton County, Kentucky
Public high schools in Kentucky
1936 establishments in Kentucky